Thawatchai Damrong-Ongtrakul (born June 25, 1974) is a Thai football manager and former player. he is the current technical director Thai League 1 club of PT Prachuap.

He played as a winger and an attacking midfielder. He played for the national team from 1993 to 2004, scoring 10 goals.

On December 14, 1998, he scored the winning goal against South Korea at the 1998 Asian Games on home soil.

International goals

Managerial statistics

Honours

Manager
 PT Prachuap
 Thai League Cup: 2019

Individual
Thai League 1 Coach of the Month: May 2018

References

1965 births
Living people
Thawatchai Damrong-Ongtrakul
Thawatchai Damrong-Ongtrakul
Thawatchai Damrong-Ongtrakul
2000 AFC Asian Cup players
Thai expatriate footballers
Thai expatriate sportspeople in Singapore
Expatriate footballers in Singapore
Sembawang Rangers FC players
Tanjong Pagar United FC players
Singapore Premier League players
Thawatchai Damrong-Ongtrakul
Thawatchai Damrong-Ongtrakul
Thawatchai Damrong-Ongtrakul
Thawatchai Damrong-Ongtrakul
Association football midfielders
Thawatchai Damrong-Ongtrakul
Thawatchai Damrong-Ongtrakul
Pattaya United F.C. managers
Thawatchai Damrong-Ongtrakul
Thawatchai Damrong-Ongtrakul
Thawatchai Damrong-Ongtrakul
Footballers at the 1994 Asian Games
Footballers at the 1998 Asian Games
Thawatchai Damrong-Ongtrakul
Southeast Asian Games medalists in football
Thawatchai Damrong-Ongtrakul
Competitors at the 1995 Southeast Asian Games
Competitors at the 1997 Southeast Asian Games
Competitors at the 1999 Southeast Asian Games
Thawatchai Damrong-Ongtrakul
Thai expatriate sportspeople in Vietnam